Philip Loring Spooner, Jr., (January 13, 1847January 2, 1918) was an American businessman and Republican politician.  He was the first insurance commissioner of the state of Wisconsin and the 18th mayor of Madison, Wisconsin.  He was a younger brother of United States senator John Coit Spooner.

Biography
Philip Spooner, Jr., was born in Lawrenceburg, Indiana, in January 1847.  He moved with his parents to Madison, Wisconsin, in 1859, where he was raised and educated.  He attended the University of Wisconsin, but did not graduate.  

In 1867 he went into the business as an insurance agent, selling fire and life insurance for Aetna and other insurers.  He also became active with the Republican Party of Wisconsin, serving on the Madison city council.  He ran for Wisconsin State Assembly in 1875, but was defeated by Liberal Republican William Charlton.

He worked in the insurance business until 1878, when he was appointed to the newly-created position of state insurance commissioner by Governor William E. Smith.  He was subsequently re-appointed to another two-year term in 1880.  The position changed into a state-wide elected office in 1881, and he was elected to continue in the office in 1881 and 1884.  He did not run for another term in 1886.

While serving as insurance commissioner, he was also elected mayor of Madison, Wisconsin, in the Spring of 1880 and served a one year term.  In addition to his insurance and political interests, he was the president and major shareholder in Madison Traction Co.  He died after a long illness at his home in Madison on January 2, 1918.

Personal life and family
Philip Loring Spooner, Jr., was the second-born son of Philip Loring Spooner and his wife Lydia Lord Spooner ( Coit).  Philip Spooner, Sr., was a prominent lawyer in Madison, clerk of the Wisconsin Supreme Court, and dean of the University of Wisconsin Law School.  Philip Jr.'s siblings included John Coit Spooner, who served 16 years as United States senator from Wisconsin, and Roger C. Spooner, who was a chairman of the Republican Party of Dane County.

Philip Spooner, Jr., was never married.  He shared a home in Madison with his sister and her husband until their deaths.

Electoral history

Wisconsin Assembly (1875)

| colspan="6" style="text-align:center;background-color: #e9e9e9;"| General Election, November 2, 1875

Wisconsin Insurance Commissioner (1881, 1884)

| colspan="6" style="text-align:center;background-color: #e9e9e9;"| General Election, November 8, 1881

| colspan="6" style="text-align:center;background-color: #e9e9e9;"| General Election, November 8, 1884

References

|-

|-

1847 births
1918 deaths
People from Lawrenceburg, Indiana
Wisconsin Republicans
Mayors of Madison, Wisconsin
State insurance commissioners of the United States
19th-century American politicians
People from Madison, Wisconsin
Insurance agents